Jane Holt  (née Wiseman; March 1673 – after 1717) was a British poet and playwright, notable for being the first self-educated labouring-class woman to have a play professionally produced in London.

Wiseman was possibly born in Holborn. She seems to have been from a modest labouring-class background and self-taught and she worked as a servant, but very little else is known about her. Her one play, Antiochus the Great, or, The Fatal Relapse, was successfully produced at the New Theatre, Lincoln's Inn Fields, in, and revived as late as 1721. It was one of forty or so plays by women produced in London between 1695 and 1723, and is notable for its emphasis on female friendship. She was part of a literary group with Susannah Centlivre, with whom she was friends, as well as George Farquhar, Abel Boyer, Ned Ward, and Tom Brown.

She is thought to have been the "Mrs Holt" whose collection of occasional and friendship poems, A Fairy Tale Inscrib'd, to the Honourable Mrs. W—, with other Poems, was published in 1717.

Wiseman took the proceeds from her success with Antiochus the Great and bought a tavern in Westminster for herself and her husband.

Etexts
Wiseman, Jane. Antiochus the Great, or, The Fatal Relapse (1701). Rpt. in Love and thunder: plays by women in the age of Queen Anne Ed. and Intro. Kendall. London: Methuen, 1988, pp. 113–153. (Free with registration at the Internet Archive)

See also

 1701 in literature
 1717 in poetry
 List of 18th-century British working-class writers

References

External links

1673 births
Year of birth uncertain
Year of death unknown
18th-century British women writers
18th-century British dramatists and playwrights
18th-century English poets
British women dramatists and playwrights
English dramatists and playwrights
English women poets
18th-century English women
18th-century English people